Seylab (also Romanized as Seylāb, Seilab, and Sīlāb) is a village in Shiramin Rural District, Howmeh District, Azarshahr County, East Azerbaijan Province, Iran. At the 2006 census, its population was 1,414, in 379 families.

References 

Populated places in Azarshahr County